Sand Lake Baptist Church is a historic Baptist church at 2960 State Route 43 in Averill Park, Rensselaer County, New York. The church was built in 1805 and is a Federal period frame building. It is a rectangular, two-story, heavy wood-frame building set on a stone foundation. The church has a gable roof and features a two-stage, semi-engaged Greek Revival style tower added in 1840. The front facade features a Palladian window. Also on the property is a contributing parsonage (1846) and garage (1939).

The church was listed on the National Register of Historic Places in 2004.

References

Baptist churches in New York (state)
Churches on the National Register of Historic Places in New York (state)
Federal architecture in New York (state)
Churches completed in 1805
19th-century Baptist churches in the United States
Churches in Rensselaer County, New York
1805 establishments in New York (state)
National Register of Historic Places in Rensselaer County, New York